FC Uttar Bongo Women is a Bangladeshi football club based on Kurigram. Its competes in country's top-tier league Bangladesh Women's Football League. However, they couldn't participate in 2020–21 BFL due to registration issues. 2022-23 will participate in the Third Division Football League.

It also runs a men's youth team in the Pioneer Football League, a Bangladeshi league for players under 15 years old. It's an big achievement by the team.

History
Established in 2019, in December of that year, the club announced that they will take part in 2020 Bangladesh Women's League, the top tier professional women's football league of Bangladesh which is resuming after seven years.

In January 2020, they announced Milon Khan, an AFC 'B' license holder, as head coach of the women's team. They signed nine international players of Bangladesh U-17, Bangladesh U-20 & Bangladesh.

Current squad

Team records

Head coach's record

All-time top scorers

 As of 9 April 2021

Personnel

Current technical staff
As of January 2019

Board of Directors
As of January 2019

BWFL position by years
BWFL, 2020: 4 of 7, 2021: Did not participate.

References

Women's football clubs in Bangladesh
Sport in Dhaka